Anagrus is a genus of fairyflies, in the family Mymaridae, comprising over 90 species, a number of which are employed as biocontrol agents. For classificatory purposes, the genus is divided into three subgenera Anagrella, Anagrus and Paranagrus. The adults lay eggs on the host, mainly Hemiptera, with a few using Odonata as hosts.

References

Mymaridae